The 1939 Taça de Portugal Final was the final match of the 1938–39 Taça de Portugal, the 1st season of the Taça de Portugal, the premier Portuguese football cup competition organized by the Portuguese Football Federation (FPF). The match was played on 25 June 1939 at the Campo das Salésias in Lisbon, and opposed two Primeira Liga sides: Académica and Benfica. Académica defeated Benfica 4–3 to claim the first Taça de Portugal.

Match

Details

References

1939
Taca
S.L. Benfica matches
Associação Académica de Coimbra – O.A.F. matches